34th Artios Awards, presented by the Casting Society of America, honoring the best originality, creativity and the contribution of casting to the overall quality of a film, television, theatre and short-form projects, was held on January 31, 2019, in simultaneous ceremonies at the Beverly Hilton Hotel, Los Angeles and Stage 48 in New York City. The New York City ceremony was hosted by Bridget Everett, while June Diane Raphael and Paul Scheer hosted the Los Angeles ceremony.

The television and theatre nominations were announced on September 20, 2018. The film nominations were announced on January 4, 2019.

Winners and nominees
Winners are listed first and highlighted in boldface:

Film
{| class=wikitable
|-
| valign="top" width="50%"|
Green Book – Rick Montgomery; Location Casting: Meagan Lewis; Associate: Thomas SullivanThe Ballad of Buster Scruggs – Ellen Chenoweth; Location Casting: Jo Edna Boldin; Associate: Susanne Scheel; Location Associate: Marie A.K. McMaster
Deadpool 2 – Mary Vernieu, Marisol Roncali; Location Casting: Corinne Clark, Jennifer Page, Yumi Takada, Nina Henninger; Associate: Raylin Sabo
Game Night – Rich Delia; Location Casting: Tara Feldstein Bennett, Chase Paris; Associate: Adam Richards
Mary Poppins Returns – Bernard Telsey, Tiffany Little Canfield; Associate: Conrad Woolfe; UK Associate: Sarah Trevis
| valign="top" width="50%"|Vice – Francine Maisler; Additional Casting: Amber WakefieldA Star Is Born – Mary Vernieu, Lindsay Graham; Associate: Raylin Sabo
Boy Erased – Carmen Cuba; Location Casting: Tara Feldstein Bennett, Chase Paris; Associate: Shelby Cherniet
The Hate U Give – Yesi Ramirez; Location Casting: Tara Feldstein Bennett, Chase Paris
Widows – Francine Maisler; Location Casting: Jennifer Rudnicke, Mickie Paskal; Associate: Amber Wakefield
|-
| valign="top" width="50%"|Crazy Rich Asians – Terri Taylor; Associate: Sarah DomeierBook Club – Kerry Barden, Paul Schnee, Avy Kaufman; Associate: Roya Semnanian, Joey Montenarello
Love, Simon – Denise Chamian; Location Casting: Tara Feldstein Bennett, Chase Paris
Private Life – Jeanne McCarthy, Rori Bergman; Associate: Karlee Fomalont
Sorry to Bother You – Eyde Belasco; Location Casting: Nina Henninger; Location Associate: Sarah Kliban
| valign="top" width="50%"|BlacKkKlansman – Kim Taylor-ColemanBeautiful Boy – Francine Maisler; Associate: Amber Wakefield
Ben Is Back – Bernard Telsey
Can You Ever Forgive Me? – Jennifer Euston; Associate: SJ Allocco
If Beale Street Could Talk – Cindy Tolan; Associate: Anne Davison
|-
| valign="top" width="50%"|The Kindergarten Teacher – Stephanie Holbrook, Henry Russell BergsteinA Private War – Jina Jay
The Miseducation of Cameron Post – Jessica Daniels
Monsters and Men – Avy Kaufman; Associate: Scotty Anderson
Unsane – Carmen Cuba
| valign="top" width="50%"|Madeline's Madeline – Stephanie HolbrookBilly Boy – Robert J. Ulrich, Eric Dawson, Carol Kritzer
Dead Women Walking – Rich Delia; Associate: Adam Richards
Searching – Lindsey Weissmueller; Associate: Mayank Bhatter
Unlovable – Meg Morman, Sunday Boling
|-
| valign="top" width="50%"|Isle of Dogs – Douglas AibelIncredibles 2 – Kevin Reher, Natalie Lyon
Ralph Breaks the Internet – Jamie Sparer Roberts; Associate: Sarah Raoufpur
Smallfoot – Ruth Lambert
| valign="top" width="50%"|Black Panther – Sarah Halley Finn; Location Casting: Meagan Lewis; Associate: Jason B. Stamey, Nicholas Amick MuddA Quiet Place – Jodi Angstreich, Maribeth Fox, Laura Rosenthal
Bumblebee – Denise Chamian; Location Casting: Nina Henninger; Additional Voice Casting: Robert McGee, Ruth Lambert; Associate: Beth Day; Location Associate: Sarah Kliban
Fantastic Beasts: The Crimes of Grindelwald – Fiona Weir
Ready Player One – Ellen Lewis, Lucy Bevan; Associate: Kate Sprance
|}

Television
{| class=wikitable
|-
| valign="top" width="50%"|Atlanta – Alexa L. Fogel; Location Casting: Tara Feldstein Bennett, Chase Paris; Associate: Kathryn Zamora-BensonBetter Things – Felicia Fasano; Associate: Tara Nostramo
Dear White People – Kim Coleman
Grace and Frankie – Tracy Lilienfield; Associate: Emily Towler
Insecure – Victoria Thomas
| valign="top" width="50%"|The Crown – Nina Gold, Robert SterneThe Americans – Rori Bergman; Associate: Dayna Katz
Game of Thrones – Nina Gold, Robert Sterne; Location Casting: Carla Stronge
The Handmaid's Tale – Sharon Bialy, Sherry Thomas, Russell Scott; Location Casting: Robin D. Cook; Associate: Jonathan Oliveira
This Is Us – Bernard Telsey, Tiffany Little Canfield, Josh Einsohn; Associate: Ryan Bernard Tymensky
|-
| valign="top" width="50%"|The Marvelous Mrs. Maisel – Jeanie Bacharach, Cindy Tolan; Associate: Anne Davison, Betsy FippingerAtypical – Bernard Telsey, Tiffany Little Canfield, Josh Einsohn; Associate: Ryan Bernard Tymensky, Rachel DillBarry – Sherry Thomas, Sharon Bialy; Associate: Stacia KimlerGLOW – Jennifer Euston, Elizabeth Barnes; Associate: Seth CaskeyYoung Sheldon – Nikki Valko, Ken Miller, Peter Pappas
| valign="top" width="50%"|'Ozark – Alexa L. Fogel; Location Casting: Tara Feldstein Bennett, Chase Paris; Associate: John OrtThe Chi – Carmen Cuba; Location Casting: Christal Karge, Marisa Ross; Associate: Judith Sunga, Jenn Noyes
Claws – Cathy Sandrich Gelfond, Jenn Presser; Location Casting: Meagan Lewis
The Deuce – Alexa L. Fogel; Associate: Kathryn Zamora-Benson
The Looming Tower – Avy Kaufman
|-
| valign="top" width="50%"|Godless – Ellen Lewis; Location Casting: Jo Edna Boldin, Helen Geier; Native American Casting: Rene Haynes; Associate: Kate Sprance, Marie A.K. McMasterThe Assassination of Gianni Versace: American Crime Story – Nicole Daniels, Courtney Bright
Black Mirror – Jina Jay; Additional U.S. Casting: Henry Russell Bergstein; Location Casting: Stephanie Gorin
Patrick Melrose – Nina Gold
The Sinner – Cami Patton, Jennifer Lare, Stephanie Holbrook, Henry Russell Bergstein, Douglas Aibel; Location Casting: Tracy Kilpatrick; Associate: Blair Foster
| valign="top" width="50%"|Paterno – Ellen Chenoweth; Associate: Susanne ScheelFahrenheit 451 – Douglas Aibel, Henry Russell Bergstein; Location Casting: Robin D. Cook; Associate: Jonathan Oliveira
Flint – Susan Edelman
Menendez: Blood Brothers – Brett Greenstein, Collin Daniel; Associate: Sherie Hernandez
The Kissing Booth – Gary M. Zuckerbrod; Location Casting: Mito Skellern
|-
| valign="top" width="50%"|Jesus Christ Superstar Live in Concert – Bernard Telsey, Patrick GoodwinA Christmas Story Live! – Bernard Telsey, Tiffany Little Canfield, Rachel Hoffman; Associate: Rachel Dill
Drunk History – Melissa DeLizia
Nickelodeon's Sizzling Summer Camp Special – Julie Rose, Ann Maney; Associate: Lindsay Klein
| valign="top" width="50%"|A Series of Unfortunate Events – David Rubin; Location Casting: Corinne Clark, Jennifer Page; Associate: Andrea BunkerAlexa & Katie – Sally Stiner
Andi Mack – Barbie Block, Amber Horn, Danielle Aufiero; Associate: Steven Tylor O'Connor
Fuller House – Alexis Frank Koczara, Christine Smith Shevchenko; Associate: Gianna Butler
School of Rock – Suzanne Goddard-Smythe
|-
| valign="top" width="50%"|Rick and Morty – Ruth Lambert, Robert McGeeBig Mouth – Julie Ashton-Barson
Bob's Burgers – Julie Ashton-Barson
The Boss Baby: Back in Business – Ania O'Hare
SpongeBob SquarePants – Gene Vassilaros
Trolls: The Beat Goes On! – Ania O'Hare, Ruth Lambert, Robert McGee
| valign="top" width="50%"|Queer Eye – Gretchen Palek, Danielle Gervais, Ally Capriotti Grant, Beyhan OguzBorn This Way – Sasha Alpert, Megan Sleeper
Project Runway – Sasha Alpert
RuPaul's Drag Race – Ethan Petersen, Goloka Bolte
The Voice – Michelle McNulty
|}

Short-Form Projects

Theatre

Lynn Stalmaster AwardLaura DernMarion Dougherty New York Apple AwardTina FeyJeff RaymondHoyt Bowers AwardRobert J. UlrichEric DawsonCarol KritzerHonorary AwardsMike FentonJoe ReichAl Onorato'''

References

Artios
Artios
Artios
January 2019 events in the United States
2019 in New York City
2019 in Los Angeles
Artios Awards